The 12327 / 12328 Upasana Express is a Superfast Express train belonging to Indian Railways – Eastern Railway zone that runs between  and  in India.

It operates as train number 12327 from Howrah Junction to Dehradun and as train number 12328 in the reverse direction, serving the states of West Bengal, Jharkhand, Bihar, Uttar Pradesh & Uttarakhand and is one of two trains that connect Howrah & Dehradun, the other train being the 13009 / 10 Doon Express.

Coaches

The 12327/12328 Upasana Express presently has 1 AC 2 tier, 3 AC 3 tier, 7 Sleeper class car, 3 General Unreserved & 2 SLR (Seating cum Luggage Rake) coaches. It has a pantry car.

As is customary with most train services in India, coach composition may be amended at the discretion of Indian Railways depending on demand.

Service

The 12327/12328 Upasana Express covers the distance of 1587 kilometres in 29hours 00 mins (54.72 km/hr) in both directions.

Its fare includes a Superfast surcharge.

Routeing

Traction

As the route is fully electrified, it is hauled by a Howrah-based WAP-4 / WAP-7 locomotive from Howrah to Dehradun and vice versa.

Timings

 12327 Upasana Express leaves Howrah every Tuesday & Friday at 13:10 hrs IST and reaches Dehradun at 18:10 hrs IST Wednesday & Saturday.
 12328 Upasana Express leaves Dehradun every Wednesday & Saturday at 22:15 hrs IST and reaches Howrah at 03:15 hrs IST Friday & Monday.

Rake sharing
The train shares its rake with 12369/12370 Kumbha Express.

References

External links

Rail transport in Howrah
Trains from Dehradun
Express trains in India
Rail transport in West Bengal
Rail transport in Jharkhand
Rail transport in Bihar
Rail transport in Uttar Pradesh
Railway services introduced in 2000
Named passenger trains of India